Romane Bohringer (born 14 August 1973) is a French actress, film director, screenwriter, and costume designer. She is the daughter of Richard Bohringer and sister of Lou Bohringer. Her parents named her after Roman Polanski.

She won the César Award for Most Promising Actress for her role in Savage Nights.

Filmography

Actress

Director

Voice

External links

 
Romane Bohringerat the Yahoo Movies 

1973 births
Living people
People from Oise
French film actresses
French film directors
French costume designers
French voice actresses
French women film directors
20th-century French actresses
21st-century French actresses
French women screenwriters
French screenwriters
Most Promising Actress César Award winners
French people of German descent
French people of Vietnamese descent